Birla Vishvakarma Mahavidyalaya (BVM) is a grant-aided engineering institution located in the educational town of Vallabh Vidyanagar, Gujarat, India. It is affiliated to Gujarat Technological University and became an autonomous institution in August 2015. Founded in 1948, it is one of the oldest engineering colleges in India and the first degree engineering college in the state of Gujarat. Managed by Charutar Vidya Mandal, BVM offers graduate, postgraduate and doctoral programmes in engineering.

History
Birla Vishvakarma Mahavidyalaya Engineering College was established in 1948 from donations made by the Birla Education Trust on the behest of Sardar Vallabhbhai Patel, the first Home Minister of independent India. The college was inaugurated by Lord Mountbatten, the Governor General of India on 14 June 1948, and rose to prominence under the stewardship of Prof. Junnarkar and Prof. K. M. Dholakia. It was one of the first few colleges in India that adopted the progressive credit system of relative grading in India. The college has awarded degrees to over 20,000 graduates.

University affiliations
 Bombay University: June 1948– May 1951
 Gujarat University: June 1951– May 1957
 Sardar Patel University: June 1957– June 2008
 Gujarat Technological University: June 2008 - June 2015
 From 2015 onwards it has been granted autonomy. Now it is an autonomous institution.

Academics
The institution offers engineering courses approved by the AICTE, for undergraduate students to doctoral scholars full- and part-time.

Centre of excellence
The college has center of excellence setup by SLS setup.

Industry collaboration
The college is recognized for testing of materials, BIS certifications, environmental auditing, calibration of electrical and electronics instruments and gadgets.

Admissions
In addition to providing admissions to high school graduates from the state of Gujarat, the college offers admissions to students from other states as well, via a competitive entrance examination.

Notable alumni
 A. M. Naik, Executive Chairman, Larsen & Toubro Limited, awarded Padma Vibhushan, India's second highest civilian award, on 26 January 2019
 Bharatsinh Madhavsinh Solanki, Indian Politician,

References

Educational institutions established in 1948
Engineering colleges in Gujarat
1948 establishments in Bombay State
Education in Anand district